The 1932 Paris–Roubaix was the 33rd edition of the Paris–Roubaix, a classic one-day cycle race in France. The single day event was held on 27 March 1932 and stretched  from Paris to its end in a velodrome in Roubaix. The winner was Romain Gijssels from Belgium.

Results

References

Paris–Roubaix
Paris–Roubaix
Paris–Roubaix
Paris–Roubaix